Gün Temür, regnal name Toqoqan Khan, (1377–1402) was a khagan of the Northern Yuan dynasty, reigning from 1399 to 1402. Erdeniin Tobchi claimed that Gün Temür was the eldest son of Elbeg Nigülesügchi Khan, but records in Habib al-siyar and Zafarnama he as other Genghizid (maybe descendant of Ariq Böke). His name, Gün Temür, means "Deep (intellectually) Iron" in the Mongolian language.

Reign 
In 1402, Gün Temür was defeated by Gulichi (possibly with Arughtai), who killed him as a result. Gulichi later seizes the title Örüg Temür Khan. Several years later, Elbeg Nigülesügchi Khan's son Bunyashiri returned to Mongolia and succeed the throne, known as Öljei Temür Khan.

See also
 List of khans of the Northern Yuan dynasty

References

1377 births
1402 deaths
Northern Yuan rulers
14th-century Mongol rulers
15th-century Mongol rulers
15th-century Chinese monarchs